Albert Odyssey may refer to:

 Albert Odyssey (1993 video game), the Super Famicom game
 Albert Odyssey 2: Jashin no Taidou, the sequel
 Albert Odyssey: Legend of Eldean, the Sega Saturn game